Selawik Airport  is a state-owned public-use airport located in Selawik, a city in the Northwest Arctic Borough of the U.S. state of Alaska.

Facilities 
Selawik Airport has two gravel surfaced runways: 3/21 measuring: 3,002 x 60 ft (915 x 18 m) and 9/27 measuring 2,659 x 60 ft. (810 x 18 m).

Airlines and destinations 

Prior to its bankruptcy and cessation of all operations, Ravn Alaska served the airport from multiple locations.

Selawik Airport Information

Origin Airport - Selawik

Origin Airport IATA Code - WLK

Origin City Name - Selawik

References

External links
 FAA Alaska airport diagram (GIF)
 

Airports in Northwest Arctic Borough, Alaska
Airports in the Arctic